The 1965 LPGA Tour was the 16th season since the LPGA Tour officially began in 1950. The season ran from March 18 to November 28. The season consisted of 30 official money events. Kathy Whitworth won the most tournaments, eight. She also led the money list with earnings of $28,658.

There were two first-time winners in 1965: Susie Maxwell and Jo Ann Prentice.

The tournament results and award winners are listed below.

Tournament results
The following table shows all the official money events for the 1965 season. "Date" is the ending date of the tournament. The numbers in parentheses after the winners' names are the number of wins they had on the tour up to and including that event. Majors are shown in bold.

^ - weather-shortened tournament

Awards

References

External links
LPGA Tour official site
1965 season coverage at golfobserver.com

LPGA Tour seasons
LPGA Tour